The Municipal Corporation Mohali (MCM) also known as Municipal Corporation SAS Nagar is the civic body that governs the planned city of Mohali in Punjab, India. Mohali is also the headquarters of the Sahibzada Ajit Singh Nagar district, popularly known as SAS Nagar, of the Punjab State.There are 50 wards of the city. There was 60.48% voter turnout in first election held on 22 February 2015.

Past City Corporation (2015-2020)
Kulwant Singh was inaugural Mayor of Mohali since 31 August 2015 while Rishabh Jain was elected senior Deputy Mayor and Manjit Singh Sethi was Deputy Mayor of Mohali until 2020. Following is list of corporators chosen after Mohali Municipal Council Election 2015:-

Wards and Councillors 

The main problems in city include parking, water shortage, garbage and parks/green belts maintenance are to be taken care of by these corporators.

References

External links

Official Facebook of the Municipal Corporation of SAS Nagar (Mohali)
Official Logo

Municipal corporations in Punjab, India
Mohali
2015 establishments in Punjab, India